"Trippin' (That's the Way Love Works)" is a song by American recording artist Toni Braxton. It was written by Braxton, Johntá Austin, Bryan-Michael Cox and Kendrick "WyldCard" Dean for her fifth studio album, Libra (2005), while production was overseen by Cox, with co-production from Keri Lewis and additional production by Dean. Selected as the album's second single, the piano-heavy R&b ballad was released to US radios on September 26, 2005, followed by a European release in fall 2005. Commercially, it missed the US Billboard Hot 100 and charted outside the top sixty of the Hot R&B/Hip-Hop Songs.

Critical reception
Billboards Chuck Taylor found that "Trippin' (That's the Way Love Works)" seems "like a track designed for Ciara, Ashanti or some other minor talent. It is not displeasing, but Braxton comes across as more of a response singer to the chorus of background singers [...] This one just doesn't measure up."

Track listing

Notes
 signifies a co-producer
 signifies an additional producer

Personnel
Credits adapted from liner notes of Libra.

Toni Braxton – vocals, backing vocals
Siete – guitar
Tamar Braxton – backing vocals
Johnta Austin – backing vocals

Bryan-Michael Cox – producer
Keri Lewis – co-producer
Kendrick "WyldCard" Dean – additional producer, strings
Sam Thomas – engineer, mixing

Charts

Release history

References

2000s ballads
2005 singles
2005 songs
Toni Braxton songs
Blackground Records singles
Contemporary R&B ballads
Songs written by Johntá Austin
Songs written by Bryan-Michael Cox
Songs written by Kendrick Dean
Songs written by Toni Braxton